The Tyrrell Racing Organisation was an auto racing team and Formula One constructor founded by Ken Tyrrell (1924–2001) which started racing in 1958 and started building its own cars in 1970. The team experienced its greatest success in the early 1970s, when it won three Drivers' Championships and one Constructors' Championship with Jackie Stewart. The team never reached such heights again, although it continued to win races through the 1970s and into the early 1980s, taking the final win for the Ford Cosworth DFV engine at Detroit in 1983. The team was bought by British American Tobacco in 1997 and completed its final season as Tyrrell in 1998. Tyrrell's legacy continues in Formula One as the Mercedes-AMG F1 team, who is Tyrrell's descendant through various sales and rebrandings via BAR, Honda and Brawn GP.

Lower formulas (1958–1967)
Tyrrell Racing first came into being in 1958, running Formula Three cars for Ken Tyrrell and local stars.  Realising he was not racing driver material, Ken Tyrrell stood down as a driver in 1959, and began to run a Formula Junior operation using the woodshed owned by his family business, Tyrrell Brothers, as a workshop.  Throughout the 1960s, Tyrrell moved through the lower formulas, variously giving single seater debuts to John Surtees and Jacky Ickx.  But the team's most famous partnership was the one forged with Jackie Stewart, who first signed up in 1963.

Tyrrell ran the BRM Formula Two operation throughout 1965, 1966 and 1967 whilst Stewart was signed to BRM's Formula One team.  The team then signed a deal to run F2 cars made by French company Matra. Tyrrell's first entry into a World Championship Grand Prix was at the 1966 German Grand Prix, entering F2-spec Matra MS5s for Ickx and Hubert Hahne. Hahne finished 9th, runner-up of the F2 cars. However, Ickx was involved in a first-lap crash with the Brabham of John Taylor, who later died from burns sustained in the accident. Tyrrell later entered the 1967 German Grand Prix with an F2 car for Ickx, this time the Matra MS7. Ickx qualified with the 3rd-fastest time, however F2 cars were required to start the race from the back of the grid. He ran as high as 5th before retiring from the race with a broken suspension.

Formula One (1968–1998)

1960s

With the help of Elf and Ford, Tyrrell then achieved his dream of moving to Formula One in 1968 as team principal for Matra International, a joint-venture established between Tyrrell's own privateer team and the French auto manufacturer Matra. Stewart was a serious contender, winning three Grands Prix in the Tyrrell-run Matra MS10. The car's most innovative feature was the use of aviation-inspired structural fuel tanks. These allowed the chassis to be around 15 kg lighter while still being stronger than its competitors. The FIA considered the technology to be unsafe and decided to ban it for 1970, insisting on rubber bag-tanks.

For the 1969 championship, the Matra works team decided not to compete in Formula One. Matra would instead focus its efforts on Ken Tyrrell's 'Matra International' team and build a new DFV powered car with structural fuel tanks, even though it would only be eligible for a single season. Stewart won the 1969 title easily, driving the new Cosworth-powered Matra MS80 which corrected most of the weaknesses of the MS10. Stewart's title was the first won by a French car, and the only one won by a car built in France as well as by a car entered by a privateer team. It was a spectacular achievement from the British team and the French constructor that both had only entered Formula One the previous year.

1970s

For the 1970 season following Matra's merger with Simca, Tyrrell were asked by Matra to use their V12 rather than the Cosworth. Simca was a subsidiary of the American company Chrysler, a rival of Ford. 
Stewart tested the Matra V12 and found it inferior to the DFV. As a large part of the Tyrrell budget was provided by Ford, and another significant element came from French state-owned petroleum company Elf, which had an agreement with Renault that precluded supporting a Simca partner, Ken Tyrrell had little alternative but to buy a March 701 chassis as interim solution while developing his own car in secret.

Tyrrell was still sponsored by French fuel company Elf, and Tyrrell would retain the traditional French blue racing colours for most of the rest of its existence. Tyrrell and Stewart ran the March-Fords throughout 1970 with mixed success, while Derek Gardner worked on the first in-house Tyrrell Grand Prix car at the woodshed in Ockham, Surrey.

It earned Stewart a pole position in the Canadian GP but suffered mechanical failures in all of its three race starts. Stewart's 1972 challenge was ruined by a stomach ulcer, but he returned to full fitness in 1973. He and Cevert finished first and fourth in the Championship, but Cevert was killed in practice for the final race of the season, the US Grand Prix at Watkins Glen. Stewart, who was to retire at the end of the season, and Tyrrell immediately stood down, effectively handing the Constructors' title to Lotus. At the end of the season Stewart made public his decision to retire, a decision that was already made before the US Grand Prix. Without their star driver or his skilled French protégé aboard, Tyrrell were never serious World Championship contenders again.

Despite this, the team remained a force throughout the 1970s, winning races with Jody Scheckter and Patrick Depailler. Most notable of these was Scheckter's triumph at the 1976 Swedish Grand Prix, giving Tyrrell a 1–2 finish driving the distinctive Derek Gardner designed Tyrrell P34 car. The P34 was the first (and only) successful six-wheeler F1 car, which replaced the conventional front wheels with smaller wheels mounted in banks of two on either side of the car. The design was abandoned after Goodyear refused to develop the small tyres needed for the car as they were too busy fighting the other tyre manufacturers in Formula One.

Ken Tyrrell had been spending a lot of his own money running his team, but in the summer of 1979 he finally found a sponsor: Italian appliance manufacturing group Candy put up the money to run the 009, fielded by Jarier and Pironi.

1980s

In 1977, the Turbo era dawned in Grand Prix racing, which was, by the mid-1980s, to render normally-aspirated-engined cars obsolete. Without the proper funding, Tyrrell was the last to race with the Cosworth DFV when all other teams had switched to turbocharged engines; during the height of FISA-FOCA war, Ken Tyrrell was adamant that turbochargers constitute a form of turbine, which had been banned in 1971, a protest that was rejected by FIA stewards. It was the beginning of two decades of struggle for Tyrrell, who was often underfunded through lack of sponsorship. It seemed appropriate, then, that the final win for the classic Cosworth Ford DFV engine was taken by a Tyrrell car (the Tyrrell 011), driven by Michele Alboreto at the 1983 Detroit Grand Prix. It was also Tyrrell's last Grand Prix win.

1984 controversy
At the time, the Formula One regulations specified a minimum weight which was more than achievable with non-turbocharged cars – though not with a turbocharged car due to greater complexity – leading to some cars being built light and ballasted up to the minimum weight to optimise weight distribution. However, rules then also specified that the cars were to be weighed filled with their usual fluids. In 1982, other teams (chiefly Brabham and Williams) had used this provision to develop cars with features such as 'water-cooled brakes' – the car officially started the race with a large, full water tank, the water was released in the general direction of the brakes and the car ran underweight when on track and unable to be weighed, only to be later topped up sufficient water to ensure the weight limit was not breached.

As Tyrrell was the only naturally aspirated engine user in 1984 season, they were uniquely placed to be able to benefit from a similar strategy of the water brake. In Tyrrell's case, the engine was equipped with a water injection system (a common means of lowering cylinder temperatures to increase power), whose supply tank was to be topped up late in the race. In addition, the FIA had already made provision to reduce the fuel allowance for each race during the season to 220 litres and banned the refueling of 1982–83, reducing the power available to turbocharged runners while imposing little restriction on more efficient non-turbo runners. Predictably turbo-powered teams were against this move, leaving only Tyrrell – whose engine did not need the additional fuel – in favour of it. However, F1 rules required unanimity for the change to be scrapped, leaving Tyrrell in the way.

It had been observed in races that, after Tyrrell's final pit stop, lead shot could be seen escaping from the top of the car. It turned out that Tyrrell were running the car underweight during the race then, in the closing stages, topping up water injection supply tanks with an additional two gallons of water mixed with 140 lb of lead shot to ensure it made the weight limit. As this was pumped in under significant pressure, some escaped through the tank vent and rained down on neighbouring pits, in sufficient quantities for other teams to sweep the shot away before their drivers pitted.

After the Detroit Grand Prix where Martin Brundle had finished in second for Tyrrell, the top cars were, as usual, impounded for inspection for compliance with the rules.  Following this, it was alleged that the water was in fact 27.5% aromatics and constituted an additional fuel source. Tyrrell were thus charged with:
 Taking on additional fuel during the race (then illegal)
 Use of illegal fuel (the aromatic-water mix)
 Equipping the car with illegal fuel lines (the lines from the water tank to the water injection system)
 Using ballast that was incorrectly fixed to the car (the lead shot in the water tank)

As a consequence of these charges, Tyrrell were excluded from the 1984 world championship and retroactively disqualified from all races that year. Further analysis showed that the actual fuel content of the water was significantly below 1% and well within rules. Additionally, Tyrrell argued that the requirement was that the ballast had to be fixed so it required tools to remove – which they felt was the case with the shot as contained within the water tank. Tyrrell subsequently went to the FIA court of appeal. On appeal, the evidence that the water's fuel content was in fact far lower than originally suggested was ignored, and the charges amended to:
 The fuel in the water
 Unsecured ballast
 Illegal holes in the bottom of the car, in violation of flat bottom rules designed to eliminate ground effect (eventually determined to be vents of no aerodynamic effect)

Nonetheless, the international judging panel upheld the original decision; Tyrrell were excluded from the championship – and was banned for last three races, and with them, further fines by FISA for their inability to appear in the races. With the only non-turbo team now not officially an entrant, the remaining teams had the unanimity they required to amend the rules as they wished. Tyrrell's exclusion meant they lost all points from the 1984 season and, with them, subsidised travel benefits to the following year's championship, a huge additional cost on top of fines for no-showing races they were banned from competing.

The ban and exclusion was seen by some observers as tantamount to manipulation by the FIA who had been looking for a way to eliminate the remaining non-turbo cars from the grid to help attract more support and sponsorship from automotive manufacturers; Tyrrell ultimately adopted a turbo Renault engine mid-way through the following season and turbocharged engines became mandatory for 1986, although naturally-aspirated engines were allowed again in 1987. The ban also allowed the turbo teams to block a proposal from FISA to reduce the fuel allowance for 1985. A further blow followed when Bellof, one of the victims of the scheme, was killed at the 1985 1000 km of Spa.

1990s

Tyrrell struggled on through the 1980s and 1990s – the team consistently punching above their financial weight following the 1984 controversy, despite winning the Colin Chapman Trophy for naturally-aspirated constructors in 1987 following Renault's withdrawal that year. There was a brief revival of fortunes in the early 1990s. The combination of Harvey Postlethwaite's revolutionary anhedral high-nose Tyrrell 019 and Jean Alesi's full debut season in 1990 brought the team two second places at Phoenix and Monaco – Alesi having led 30 laps of the Phoenix race. The French-Sicilian left the next year for Ferrari, but Honda engines and Braun sponsorship in 1991 helped Stefano Modena earn a front row start at Monaco alongside Senna and a fine second-place finish at the 1991 Canadian Grand Prix. Nonetheless,  the team slowly dropped back from the middle of the pack. Tyrrell's last F1 points were scored by Mika Salo at the 1997 Monaco Grand Prix. 

Eventually, and in the face of dwindling form and ill health, Ken sold his team after the 1997 season to Craig Pollock, who at the same time was building British American Racing with his funding and sponsor partner British American Tobacco. Ken left the team following the sale, just before the start of the 1998 season, after a disagreement with Pollock over him choosing Ricardo Rosset for sponsorship money reasons over Jos Verstappen.

The final race for Tyrrell was the 1998 Japanese Grand Prix, where Rosset failed to qualify and teammate Tora Takagi retired on lap 28 after a collision with Esteban Tuero's Minardi.

Legacy
The double championship-winning Brawn GP team  of 2009 and the present Mercedes team can loosely be said to be descendants of Tyrrell, through its predecessors, Honda Racing F1 and BAR. While BAR bought the Tyrrell F1 team and entry, they used a different factory, chassis builder and engine – most of the former Tyrrell cars and equipment were sold to Paul Stoddart, later owner of the Minardi F1 team.

When team boss Ross Brawn led a management buyout of the Honda F1 team to compete in the 2009 season, a revival of the Tyrrell name was briefly considered when deciding what to call the new team.

As of the 2023 Saudi Arabian Grand Prix, the teams which descended from Tyrrell have won 125 Grands Prix, 8 Drivers' championships (one as Brawn in 2009 and the rest as Mercedes from 2014 to 2020) and 9 Constructors' championships (one as Brawn in 2009 and the rest as Mercedes from 2014 to 2021).

The Minardi 2-seater F1 cars are modifications of the 1998 Tyrrell 026 design, most noticeable in the distinctive shape of the nose of the car. These cars still run in demos today, most recently as demo cars during the launch of the Yas Marina F1 track.

Ken Tyrrell died of cancer on 25 August 2001 at the age of 77.

Formula One World Championship results

Footnotes

External links

 
Formula One entrants
Formula Two entrants
British auto racing teams
British racecar constructors
Vehicle manufacturing companies established in 1958
Vehicle manufacturing companies disestablished in 1998
1958 establishments in England
1998 disestablishments in England
1997 mergers and acquisitions
Formula One World Constructors' Champions
British Formula Three teams